Crowsnest Lake is a lake in southwestern Alberta, Canada. It lies near the summit of the Crowsnest Pass in the southern Canadian Rockies and gives rise to the Crowsnest River.

References

Crowsnest Lake